Mandara, also known as Tabar, is an Austronesian language spoken on the Tabar Group of islands, New Ireland Province, Papua New Guinea. Three dialects have been identified, Simberi, Tatau and Tabar, corresponding to the three main islands in the group.
Recently, a written form of Mandara has been made by a Korean missionary. So far, about 3,000 people are literate in this form of Mandara, and a Bible has been published in it as well.

References

Languages of New Ireland Province
Meso-Melanesian languages